Flavio Poli (1900-1984) was an Italian artist, known for his designs in glass. 

In 1929, he began working for the company "I.V.A.M." as a designer of glassware. Within three years, he was a partner in the company.
 
He left Seguso in 1963.

Poli died in 1984. A number of his works are in the Murano Glass Museum, the National Gallery of Victoria, Australia, and MoMA in New York.

References 

1900 births
1984 deaths
20th-century Italian people
Glass makers